Damon Rensing is an American soccer manager who currently coaches the Michigan State Spartans men's soccer program.

Head coaching record

External links 
 Damon Rensing at Michigan State Athletics

1975 births
Living people
Michigan State Spartans men's soccer coaches
Michigan State Spartans women's soccer coaches
Michigan State Spartans men's soccer players
UNLV Rebels women's soccer coaches
Association footballers not categorized by position
American soccer coaches
Sportspeople from Grand Rapids, Michigan
Soccer players from Michigan
Soccer coaches from Michigan
Association football players not categorized by nationality